Hilltop is a neighborhood of Denver, Colorado. According to the Piton Foundation's summary of United States Census data, the 2016 population of the neighborhood was 9,311, average household income was $215,780, and there were 3,973 housing units.

Boundaries
The City of Denver-defined neighborhood of Hilltop is bordered on the west by Colorado Boulevard, on the north by 6th Avenue, and on the south by Alameda Avenue. The eastern boundary is irregular, extending to Quebec Street at the north end, and encompassing properties on both sides of Monaco Parkway at the south end.

Landmarks
The Hilltop neighborhood gets it name from the fact that it is higher in elevation than the surrounding parts of the city. In the center of the neighborhood is Cranmer Park, with a view of the Front Range mountains. The Graland Country Day School, an independent, co-educational day school for grades K-9 is located in the neighborhood, as is Temple Emanuel, Carson Elementary, Steck Elementary and Hill Campus of Arts and Sciences.

Character
Hilltop is one of Denver's wealthiest neighborhoods. It was developed in the 1940s and 1950s, and since the 1990s, many of the original houses have being demolished and replaced with large houses on medium-sized lots.

References

Neighborhoods in Denver